Roozbeh Pournader() is a free software activist and expert on Unicode text encoding, text rendering, and fonts, especially for bidirectional text. He is originally from Iran, and is now living in the United States. After the establishment of the Persian Wikipedia, he became the first administrator of the project. He was a major assistant, participant and co-founder of the Persian Wikipedia.

He was a technical manager at Sharif Linux Project at Sharif University of Technology, and formerly served as a technical manager at FarsiTeX.

Education 
Pournader was born in Tehran, Iran, where he obtained his high school diploma in 1996 from Allameh Helli High Schools. He graduated from Sharif University of Technology in the field of computer engineering.

Career 
Pournader moved to California, where he worked at HighTech Passport, Ltd. In 2011 he was hired by Google, where he worked as an Internationalization Engineer, focusing on text encoding and rendering, fonts, and bidirectional text. He joined the Android Text team in late 2014. , he works as a software engineer for WhatsApp.

Activities 
In 2003, Pournader was appointed to provide a report for the United Nations Development Programme about computer development and computer localization in Afghanistan.

Pournader is a contributing editor of the Unicode Standard, responsible for maintaining Unicode Technical Report #53 (Unicode Arabic Mark Rendering), as well as being one the editors of the core specification. Since January 2020 he has been a Technical Director of the Unicode Consortium.

Honors 
1995 – Silver medal of International Olympiad in Informatics
1996 – Gold medal of International Olympiad in Informatics
2009 – bulldog award of Unicode Consortium
2020  Gold medal as part of the mdi winning team

See also

References

External links 

 Roozbeh Pournader speaking at Google about bidirectional text on YouTube

Living people
People from Tehran
Iranian expatriates in the United States
Google employees
People from California
Free software people
People involved with Unicode
Sharif University of Technology alumni
Year of birth missing (living people)
Wikipedia people